Cryptoblabes ephestialis is a moth of the family Pyralidae first described by George Hampson in 1903. It is found in India and Sri Lanka. The caterpillar is a pest on Ricinus communis.

References

Moths of Asia
Moths described in 1903
Phycitini